Michèle Ramsay is a South African Professor of human genetics at the National Health Laboratory Service and the University of the Witwatersrand. Ramsay's research has investigated single-gene disorders, epigenetics, obesity and hypertension. She was the President of the African Society of Human Genetics from 2014 until 2019.

Career and impact
Michèle Ramsay received her PhD from the University of the Witwatersrand.  Ramsay is the National Research Foundation of South Africa Research Chair on Genomics and Bioinformatics. Her research interests include the molecular epidemiology of single-gene disorders, the epigenetics of fetal alcohol spectrum disorder studied using mouse models and understanding the genetic and environmental risk factors for obesity and related diseases.

Ramsay has published over 140 peer-reviewed academic articles. She is a member of the Academy of Science of South Africa.

References

External links
 

South African women scientists
South African scientists
Living people
University of the Witwatersrand alumni
Academic staff of the University of the Witwatersrand
Members of the Academy of Science of South Africa
South African geneticists
Women geneticists
Year of birth missing (living people)